The Fontana della Sellaria or Selleria is a Baroque public fountain on piazzetta del Grande Archivio in Naples, Italy. It was commissioned in 1649 from Onofrio Antonio Gisolfi by Íñigo Vélez de Guevara to commemorate the latter's suppression of the Neapolitan Republic.

References

Sellaria
Baroque architecture in Italy
Buildings and structures completed in 1649